Justice Murphy refers to Frank Murphy, associate justice of the United States Supreme Court. Justice Murphy may also refer to:

John Luttrell Murphy (1842–1912), justice of the Territorial Montana Supreme Court 
Lionel Murphy (1922–1986), justice of the High Court of Australia
Loren E. Murphy, associate justice and chief justice of the Illinois Supreme Court
Michael Augustus Murphy, associate justice of the Supreme Court of Nevada
Robert C. Murphy (judge), chief judge of the Maryland Court of Appeals
Thomas W. Murphy (American Samoa judge), associate chief justice of the High Court of American Samoa
William P. Murphy (judge), associate justice of the Minnesota Supreme Court

See also
Alonzo Morphy, associate justice of the Louisiana Supreme Court
Judge Murphy (disambiguation)